HP MediaSmart Connect is a digital media player that streams or syncs media from other personal computers in an area with Wi-Fi connectivity to be played and accessed on a television screen.

It utilizes Windows Media Center Extender for the television user interface of the MediaSmart Connect box. 

It is also part of Hewlett-Packard's current MediaSmart brand, alongside HP MediaSmart Server and HP MediaSmart TV.

External links
 HP MediaSmart Connect
 Microsoft.com page for MediaSmart Connect
 HP Connect Vietnam

Digital media players